The 2013–14 ProA, was the 7th season of the ProA, the second level of basketball in Germany. BG Göttingen and Crailsheim Merlins got a place in the 2014–15 Basketball Bundesliga by reaching the Finals. Göttingen took the ProA title by winning 174–162 in two legs.

Standings

|}

Playoffs

Awards
Player of the Year:  Harper Kamp (BG Göttingen)
Youngster of the Year:  Stephan Haukohl (erdgas Ehingen/Urspr.schule)
Coach of the Year:  Ralph Junge (erdgas Ehingen/Urspr.schule)

References

ProA seasons
Germany
2013–14 in German basketball leagues